Mike Rowe is an American stock car racing driver from Turner, Maine and has the most win of any Maine driver in Maine racing history. He currently competes part-time on the Pro All Stars Series Super Late model tour. He is a three-time winner of the Oxford 250

References

External links 

Racing drivers from Maine
NASCAR drivers
Living people
Year of birth missing (living people)
People from Turner, Maine